Lepanto is an underground station on Line A of the Rome Metro. The station was inaugurated in 1980, and is at the junction of Viale Giulio Cesare with Via Lepanto and Via Marcantonio Colonna, in Prati.

The offices of the Civil Court of Rome are in Via Lepanto.

Services 
This station has:
  Ticket office

Located nearby 
 Rione Prati
 Piazza Cavour
 Piazza Cola di Rienzo
 Piazza dei Quiriti
 Teatro Adriano
 Palazzo di Giustizia
 quartiere Della Vittoria
 Palazzo RAI di viale Mazzini
 Chiesa di Cristo Re
 Museo del Mamiani

The station is said to be for Vatican City on system maps - however Ottaviano, the next station, is closer.

References

External links 
 Lepanto station on the Rome public transport site (in Italian)

Rome Metro Line A stations
Railway stations opened in 1980
1980 establishments in Italy
Rome R. XXII Prati
Railway stations in Italy opened in the 20th century